Kalpathy Balakrishnan is an Indian  percussionist who plays the chenda (a traditional Kerala drum), Thayambaka, Panchari melam, and Panchavadyam. He was born in the famous village called Kalpathy in the Palakkad district of Kerala. He won the Kerala Sangeetha Nataka Akademi Award for the best thayambaka artist in 2009.

References

Indian percussionists
Malayali people
Chenda players
Living people
Year of birth missing (living people)
Recipients of the Kerala Sangeetha Nataka Akademi Award